Celebrity Wish List is an 8-part series produced by Seven8Media (formerly ID-r Media) for Channel 5 broadcast in the autumn of 2011.

The series was broadcast on Monday nights on Channel 5 at 7:30 pm.  The format was that a small charity was rewarded with an awareness-raising event and practical event to help the charity or cause grow.  Each programme was hosted by a different celebrity - Michael Underwood, Stacey Solomon, Sheree Murphy, Zöe Salmon, Terri Dwyer, Jeff Brazier - and also featured a shorter strand 'Heart Warmers' hosted by the likes of Joe Swash and Ali Bastian - which were short VTs rewarding good neighbours and fundraisers.

The programme was executive produced by Rob Walker and series produced by Simon Proctor.

External links

2011 British television series debuts
2011 British television series endings
2010s British reality television series
Channel 5 (British TV channel) original programming
British documentary television series
English-language television shows